The Illustrious Order of Loyalty to the Royal House of Kedah (Bahasa Melayu: Darjah Yang Mulia Setia di-Raja)  is an honorific order of the Sultanate of Kedah.

History 
It was founded by Sultan Abdul Halim of Kedah on  21 September 1973.

Classes 
It is awarded in three classes: 
 Knight Grand Companion or Dato' Sri Setia di-Raja Kedah - SSDK
 The male titular has right to the prefix Dato' Seri and his wife, to the prefix Datin Seri
 Knight Companion or  	Dato' Setia di-Raja Kedah - DSDK
 The male titular has right to the prefix Dato' and his wife, to the prefix Datin
 Companion or Setia di-Raja Kedah - SDK

Award conditions 
 Knight Grand Companion or Dato' Sri Setia di-Raja Kedah - SSDKThis Order is conferred on those of high position who are well known for their excellence in the performance of their duties to the State and Nation, in whatever field. This Order may be held by only 25 persons at one time, and recipients are honoured with the title, "Dato' Seri". 
 Knight Companion or  	Dato' Setia di-Raja Kedah - DSDK This Order ranks second to the Darjah Yang Mulia Seri Setia. It is conferred on those in high positions, exercising great influence, who have performed, with great responsibility, much excellent service to the State and Nation. The conferment of this Order is limited to 150 persons only. For government servants, this Order is only given to those in the Management and Professional level or those of similar status. -

Insignia 
 Knight Grand Companion or Dato' Sri Setia di-Raja Kedah - SSDK . Photos : Men & Women  (a Princess of Kedah)  The insignia is composed of a collar, a breast star and a badge hanging from a sash. 
 Knight Companion or  	Dato' Setia di-Raja Kedah - DSDK. Photos : Men - 2005  & 2011  -  Women (RA)    The current insignia is composed of a badge hanging from a sash with a different pattern than the SSDK and a breast star  The former insignia of a male titular was apparently composed of a badge hanging from a collar sash similar to the SDK and a breast star (Men (Kedah) ).
 Companion or Setia - SDK. Photos : Men - titular 2010  & Women   The current insignia of a male titular is composed of a badge hanging from a collar sash (without breast star) The current insignia of a female titular is composed of a badge hanging from a breast knot.

Notable recipients 

Sultan Abdul Halim of Kedah: 
  Founding Grand Master and Knight Grand Companion (SSDK) of the Order of Loyalty to the Royal House of Kedah (SSDK-DSDK-SDK, since 21 September 1973)

Members of the Royal Family of Kedah : 

  Knight Grand Companion of the Order, with title : Dato' Seri 
 Princess Intan Safinaz DKH SSDK SHMS PSM JP PAT (Sultan Abdul Halim of Kedah and Tuanku Bahiyah's daughter and Mbr of the Regency Council 2011)   (SSDK, 28.11.1988)
 Princess Soraya SSDK SHMS (Sultan Abdul Halim of Kedah and Tuanku Bahiyah's adoptive daughter) (SSDK)	  
 Tunku Annuar, Tunku Bendahara DKH DMK SPMK SSDK PSB (2nd ygr br. of the Sultan and head of the Regency Council 2011) (SSDK) 
 His second wife, Noor Suzanna, Toh Puan Bendahara SSDK (SSDK, 12.12.2011):
 Tunku Sallehuddin, Tunku Paduka Maharaja Temenggong Angota Desa PSM SSDK SHMS BCK PAT (3rd ygr br. of the Sultan and member of the Regency Council 2011)  (SSDK):
 His wife, Tengku Maliha, Tunku Puan Temenggong SSDK (SSDK, 12.12.2011)
 Tunku Abdul Hamid Thani, Tunku Laksamana SSDK SHMS  (4th younger brother of the Sultan and member of the Regency Council 2011) (DSDK, 28.11.1991 => SSDK, 17.1.2004):
 Tunku Hamidah  SPMK SSDK SMS (eldest daughter of Sultan Badlishah of Kedah) (SSDK, 20.1.2003)
 Tunku Hosnah  SSDK (3rd daughter of Sultan Badlishah of Kedah) (SSDK, 12.12.2011)
  Knight Companion of the Order, with title : Dato' 
 Tengku Sarafuddin Badlishah DSDK (Tunku Sallehuddin & Tengku Maliha's son) (DSDK)
 Tunku Bisharah DSDK SMS (4th daughter of Sultan Badlishah of Kedah) (DSDK, 20.1.2008)
 Tunku Badriat  DSDK (5th daughter of Sultan Badlishah of Kedah) (DSDK, 20.1.2008)
 Tunku Kamaliah DSDK (6th daughter of Sultan Badlishah of Kedah) (DSDK, 21.1.2007)
 Tunku Nafisah DSDK SMS (7th daughter of Sultan Badlishah of Kedah) (DSDK, 21.1.2007)

Lists of recipients 
 List of honours of the Kedah Royal Family by country
 List of Honours of Kedah awarded to Heads of State and Royals

References 

Orders, decorations, and medals of Kedah
Kedah